This is a list of notable people associated with Bridgeport, Connecticut who achieved great public distinction, listed in the category for which they are best known.

Athletes

Baseball players
These baseball players were born in or lived in the city:
Howard Baker, Major League baseball player
Cornelius "Neal" Ball, credited with the first unassisted triple play in the major leagues

George Bryant, MLB player for Detroit Wolverines
George "Kiddo" Davis, who in the 1933 World Series against the Washington Senators had 7 hits in 19 at-bats, and batted .368, helping the New York Giants win the championship
Rob Dibble, pitcher for Cincinnati Reds, Chicago White Sox, and Milwaukee Brewers
Angel Echevarria, played in National League for Colorado Rockies, Milwaukee Brewers, and Chicago Cubs
Ray Keating, pitched for the New York Highlanders, New York Yankees, and Boston Braves
Kurt Kepshire, or Kurt David Kepshire, pitched for the St. Louis Cardinals
Charles Nagy, pitcher for Cleveland Indians and San Diego Padres, pitched in the 1995 and 1997 World Series
Tricky Nichols, pitcher for the Boston Red Caps, St. Louis Brown Stockings, Providence Grays, Worcester Ruby Legs and Baltimore Orioles
Jim O'Rourke (James Henry O'Rourke), first player to be credited with a hit and single in a professional baseball game
Ed Rowen, 19th-century baseball player for the Boston Red Caps and Philadelphia Athletics
Dan Shannon, played second base for the Louisville Colonels and the Philadelphia Quakers, and second base and shortstop for the New York Giants and the Washington Senators
Ed Wojna, pitcher for the San Diego Padres and Cleveland Indians

Basketball players
Courtney Alexander, played three seasons in the NBA and is currently an assistant coach of the College Park Skyhawks of the NBA G League
John Bagley, played for eleven seasons in the NBA
Walter Luckett, star high school and college player in the 1970s
Wes Matthews, played ten seasons in the NBA
Frank Oleynick, played two years for NBA in Seattle
Charles D. Smith, University of Pittsburgh and New York Knicks
Chris Smith, University of Connecticut and Minnesota Timberwolves
Harper Williams, basketball player

Football players
Kevin Belcher, NFL player
Keith Dudzinski, college football player and coach
Tony Elliott, played six seasons in the NFL
Nick Giaquinto, played four seasons in the NFL
Ching Hammill, football player
Mike L. Jones, NFL player for Minnesota Vikings, Indianapolis Colts and Seattle Seahawks
Alex Joseph, pro football player

Soccer players
Alyssa Naeher, goalkeeper for the Chicago Red Stars in the National Women's Soccer League (NWSL) and United States women's national soccer team (USWNT)

Hockey players
Julie Chu, three-time Olympic ice hockey medalist

Tennis players
Sidney Wood, tennis player, won at Wimbledon in 1931, reached Davis Cup finals in 1934

Boxers
Jack Delaney, world light heavyweight boxing champion

Business people

Kenton Clarke, founder of Computer Consulting Associates International Inc.
Fred DeLuca, founder of Subway
George Gilman, founder of the Great Atlantic and Pacific Tea Company
Edwin H. Land, founder of Polaroid Corporation
James Murren (born 1961), banker
Nathaniel Wheeler, manufacturer of Wheeler & Wilson; state legislator

Entertainers, artists, writers
P.T. Barnum, circus owner, entrepreneur and mayor of Bridgeport
Madeline Blair, prostitute and naval stowaway
Robert O. Bowen, novelist
Al Capp, cartoonist, creator of comic strip Li'l Abner
Adriana Caselotti, voice of Snow White
Adger Cowans, fine arts photographer and abstract painter
Perry DeAngelis, co-founder and executive director of NESS, co-founder of The Skeptics' Guide to the Universe
Sally Haley, artist and painter
Maureen Howard, author
Walt Kelly, cartoonist, creator of Pogo
Larry Kramer, playwright and gay rights activist, writer of The Normal Heart
Roy Neuberger, art collector and donor
Charles Schnee, screenwriter and film producer
Jim Shepard, author
Cyndy Szekeres, children's book author and illustrator
General Tom Thumb (Charles Stratton), performer, little person

Actors
Richard Belzer, actor and comedian who once worked as a reporter for The Connecticut Post
Alexandra Breckenridge, actress
Adriana Caselotti, actress
Bob Crane, actor known for his lead role in Hogan's Heroes; radio host on WICC-AM in Bridgeport, 1950–1955
Brian Dennehy, actor
Arline Judge, actress
John Mitchum, actor
Robert Mitchum, actor
Tony Musante, actor
Kevin Nealon, comedian and actor
John Ratzenberger, actor known for role of Cliff Clavin in TV series Cheers
Bill Smitrovich, actor
Deborah Walley, actress
Michael Jai White, actor

Musicians
Art Baron, jazz trombonist
Mimi Benzell, Metropolitan Opera soprano
Joseph Celli, oboist
Fanny Crosby, composer of more than 8,000 Christian hymns; lived here for the last fifteen years of her life; buried in the Mountain Grove Cemetery
Vernon Dalhart, singer-songwriter
Jessica Delfino, musician, comedian
Jin Hi Kim, geomungo player and composer
Deon Kipping, gospel singer
Paul Leka, singer-songwriter, composer, member of band Steam, known for "Na Na Hey Hey Kiss Him Goodbye"
Angus Maclise, experimental musician and poet, founding member of The Velvet Underground
John Mayer, singer-songwriter, born in Bridgeport, largely grew up in neighboring Fairfield
Peter McCann, singer-songwriter, "Do You Wanna Make Love", "Right Time of the Night"
Syesha Mercado, singer, actress and American Idol contestant
Lou "Boulder" Richards, guitarist (Hatebreed)
Vinnie Vincent, guitarist (KISS)
Robert Wendel, composer, musician

Musical groups
The Alternate Routes (2002–present), rock band
Hatebreed (1994–present), metallic hardcore band
Last Common Ancestor (2018–present), punk grunge band
The Skinny Boys, 1980s rap group
Steam, late 1960s pop band
The Stepkids (2009–present), psych soul band
Youthful Praise (2001–present), gospel choir

Government service
David H. Burr, cartographer 
Robert E. De Forest, Mayor, Congressman
Paul Gottfried, former professor of Elizabethtown College
Robert A. Hurley (1895–1968), Connecticut governor (first Roman Catholic to hold that office in Connecticut)
Leonard Mastroni (1949–2020), Kansas state representative and judge
Jasper McLevy (1933–1957), Mayor
Margaret E. Morton (1924–2012), first African American woman to serve in the Connecticut General Assembly
Mae Schmidle, Connecticut state representative
William Shaler, U.S. Consul in Mexico, Algiers and Havana
James C. Shannon (1896–1980), Connecticut governor
Christopher Shays, Fourth District Congressman
Samuel Simons (1792–1847), United States Representative from Connecticut
Rich Whitney, Green Party candidate for Governor of Illinois

Inventors

Harvey Hubbell, inventor of the electric plug and the pull-chain light socket
Louis Latimer, inventor
Charles F. Ritchel, inventor
Gustave Whitehead, inventor
William Higinbotham, worked on the nuclear bomb, created one of the first video games "Table For Two".

Medical
Alfred Fones, dentist credited with founding the profession of dental hygiene in 1906

Military
David Hawley, Naval commander and privateer during the American Revolution
Raymond Jacobs, claimed to be in photo of first flag raised on Iwo Jima in World War II
Henry A. Mucci, led the raid that rescued survivors of the Bataan Death March in World War II

Religious
Edward Egan, former Roman Catholic bishop of Bridgeport, later became the cardinal archbishop of New York

Other
Victoria Leigh Soto, born in Bridgeport, former school teacher, victim of the Sandy Hook Elementary School shooting, died at age 27

See also
 List of people from Connecticut
 List of people from Brookfield, Connecticut
 List of people from Darien, Connecticut
 List of people from Greenwich, Connecticut
 List of people from Hartford, Connecticut
 List of people from New Canaan, Connecticut
 List of people from New Haven, Connecticut
 List of people from Norwalk, Connecticut
 List of people from Redding, Connecticut
 List of people from Ridgefield, Connecticut
 List of people from Stamford, Connecticut
 List of people from Westport, Connecticut

References

External links
List of major league baseball players from Bridgeport

Bridgeport Connecticut
Bridgeport Connecticut